The South Dakota Highway Patrol is the state police agency for South Dakota, which has jurisdiction everywhere in the state except for sovereign Native American reservations.  It was created to protect the lives, property and constitutional rights of people in South Dakota. In addition to enforcement of laws, the SDHP has regional SWAT teams that provide tactical and warrant services to police and Sheriff Departments. The SDHP is also responsible for training K-9 teams to law enforcement agencies in South Dakota.  The SDHP also has a division responsible for executive protection of the state dignitaries and protection of the capital grounds and administrative state buildings and grounds. There are currently 201 members (i.e., state troopers) of the South Dakota Highway Patrol.

Jurisdiction
Troopers with the South Dakota Highway Patrol are entrusted with the authority to conduct investigations concerning violations of criminal and traffic statutes throughout the state, regardless of city, township, or county boundaries.

Including traffic enforcement, in communities that already have a police presence, the South Dakota Highway Patrol may respond to citizen calls. The South Dakota Highway Patrol has statewide jurisdiction, and frequently assists other agencies with emergency calls for service ranging from accidents, criminal investigations to fights in progress. As a mission of the South Dakota Highway Patrol, they will preserve peace and order.

Headquarters staff are based out of Pierre. A Motor Carrier Division is also headquartered in Pierre.

History

In 1935, the Governor of South Dakota, Tom Berry, recognized the need for an organization to enforce the traffic laws and provide assistance to the motoring public. Governor Berry appointed ten men that were known as the "Courtesy Patrol", tasked with enforcing all the laws in South Dakota and helping to inform the public about the state's emerging traffic regulations.

The legislature abolished the Department of Justice in 1937 and the authority for the Highway Patrol was transferred to the Highway Department.  The Courtesy Patrol was disbanded and the new Motor Patrol was founded, with Superintendent Walter J. Goetz.  Chief Goetz increased the number of Motor Patrolmen from eight to forty and his tenure is most noted for the acquisition of two-way radios for each patrol car in 1948.

The Patrol was involved in many life-saving efforts during the record blizzard of 1949.  The blizzards and floods of 1952 taxed the resources of the Motor Patrol. 1953 ushered in the South Dakota Drivers License and 179 people died on South Dakota roads.

A 40 million dollar highway construction project began in 1956 and the role of the Motor Patrolman as an enforcement officer began to change.  Traffic fatalities were on the rise and the Patrol was given a mandate to reduce fatal accidents.

1958 saw the Oahe Dam closure completed and a record 240 people died on South Dakota roads.  By executive order, various colored and unmarked patrol vehicles were utilized for a time to help reduce the death toll from traffic accidents.  The port of entry system was started on a trial basis.

A SWAT division was established in 1974.

Fallen officers
Since the establishment of the South Dakota Highway Patrol, 5 officers have died in the line of duty.

See also

 List of law enforcement agencies in South Dakota
 State police
 State patrol
 Highway patrol

References

External links
South Dakota Highway Patrol website

State law enforcement agencies of South Dakota
Government agencies established in 1956
1956 establishments in South Dakota